LaTasha Jenkins (born December 19, 1977) is an American former track and field sprinter. Having won international medals in the 200 m, she won a silver medal at the 2001 World Indoor Championships and a silver medal at the 2001 Outdoor Championships. Other career highlights include 2001 U.S. Indoor 200m champion; 1999 and 2001 US Outdoor runner-up, 200m; 1999 NCAA 200m champion; four-time NCAA All-American; member of world record-holding  relay team. She was born in Chicago and attended Oak Lawn Polaris High School.

After winning the 1999 NCAA 200m title and finishing second to Marion Jones at the U.S. Championships, Jenkins was poised to make her mark on the international scene, but a collapsed lung she suffered on the flight to the 1999 World University Games forced her to with withdraw from that meet as well as the World Championships. She recovered in 2000 and in 2001 had terrific results under new coach Norbert Elliott in Georgia, winning her first U.S. title indoors and winning silver at the 2001 World Indoor Championships. She went on to finish runner-up to Jones outdoors at 200m and was fourth at the World Outdoor Championships. She graduated from Ball State University with a degree in English and a minor in counseling psychology. She scored 25 points at the Mid-American meet in 1998, and her 1999 NCAA crown was the first ever national championship for Ball State women's track & field.

Jenkins holds a world record, as a member of the American 4 × 200 m relay team that ran 1:27.46 on April 29, 2000 in Philadelphia, Pennsylvania, the other team members being LaTasha Colander-Richardson, Nanceen Perry and Marion Jones. Note that 4 × 200 m is not a regular track event and not a part of the program for any major international championship.

According to the Chicago Tribune on August 25, 2006, Jenkins had her A sample fail in a drugs test taken in late July that year. The discovered substance was nandrolone. Latasha Jenkins appealed the alleged tests and was later exonerated of all charges. She is the only athlete in history to win an anti-doping case against USADA. WADA agreed with the findings of the USADA verdict and dropped their appeal.

Latasha Jenkins was inducted in the Ball State University Sports Hall of Fame in February 2009.

References

 

1977 births
Living people
Track and field athletes from Chicago
American female sprinters
African-American female track and field athletes
World Athletics Championships medalists
World Athletics Championships athletes for the United States
World Athletics record holders (relay)
World Athletics Indoor Championships medalists
21st-century African-American sportspeople
21st-century African-American women
20th-century African-American sportspeople
20th-century African-American women
20th-century African-American people